The 1975 Hamilton Tiger-Cats season was the 18th season for the team in the Canadian Football League and their 26th overall. The Tiger-Cats finished in 3rd place in the Eastern Conference with a 5–10–1 record, but lost the Eastern Semi-Final to the Montreal Alouettes.

Tiger-Cats president Ralph Sazio became president of the Canadian Football League in 1975. It would be Garney Henley's last season with the Tiger-Cats where he finished his career with 56 touchdowns. At the time, it was the franchise record for most touchdowns in a Tiger-Cats career. Long-time CFL star Jerry Keeling would join the Tiger-Cats midway through the season, as it would also be his final season in the CFL.

Terry Evanshen set a Tiger-Cats record (since broken) for most touchdowns in one season by a Tiger-Cats player with 13. On September 7, Evanshen scored four of those touchdowns in one game against the Ottawa Rough Riders. He tied Garney Henley's record for most touchdowns in one game by a Tiger-Cats player. In the same game, Evanshen would set a franchise record with most points in one game by scoring 26 points.

Tragedy struck the CFL in October, when 23-year-old, Hamilton Tiger-Cats star Tom Pate suffered an aneurysm in the fourth quarter against the Stampeders at McMahon Stadium. Pate was never again conscious and would die two days later. A year later, the CFLPA announced the Tom Pate Memorial Award in his honour to be awarded to the player who best personifies a unique combination of outstanding sportsmanship and dedication to the league and the community.

Roster

Regular season

Season standings

Season schedule

Post-season

Awards and honours

CFL All-Stars
None

References

Hamilton Tiger-cats Season, 1975
Hamilton Tiger-Cats seasons
Hamilton Tiger-Cats